Alexander Fry (10 September 1821, Pencraig, Herefordshire −1905) was an English entomologist who specialised in Coleoptera.

In 1838 Alexander Fry entered his father’s mercantile business house in Rio de Janeiro, Brazil. He became a partner in 1843. Except for once returning to England to marry he lived in Rio until 1854 when he moved to London. He still visited Rio after this year.
Fry and his young wife lived at Norwood. They had no children.
Alexander Fry bequeathed his collection of some 200,000 specimens to the Natural History Museum, London. The collection is worldwide but especially rich in South American insects, Longicornia and Curculionidae. He also donated his library of 611 volumes to the museum.

Alexander Fry became a Member of the Entomological Society of London in 1885.

Fry was an enthusiastic collector and in addition to his own beetles he added by purchase the collections of Frederic Parry (Longicornia), Alfred Russel Wallace, William Doherty, and the ‘’very fine’’ series collected by John Whitehead at Kinabalu, which included all the types described by Henry Walter Bates. 
He did no descriptive work but many parts of his collection were named by other entomologists and it is therefore type rich.

References
Rowland-Brown, H. 1905. Societies. Entomologist's Monthly Magazine, Second series. 16[41]: 98—99. Available at:   [Mention of death on p. 99]

Burr, M. 1905. Obituary. Entomologist's Monthly Magazine, Second series. 16[41]: 119—120. Available at: . [Fry's obituary is on p. 119]

English entomologists
1905 deaths
1821 births